Jimmy Kennedy (born July 7, 1988) of Fox Lake, Illinois is an American wrestler for New York Athletic Club who represented the United States at the 2014 World Wrestling Championships.

High school
Kennedy attended Grant Community High School in Fox Lake, Illinois  from 2002–2006. Kennedy was a four time placewinner in the Illinois state tournament, winning state titles in 2004 and 2006, and finishing top 3 every year. Kennedy finished his high school career with a 187–3 record (98.4% winning percentage), and won the Dave Schultz High School Excellence Award in 2006 as the best high school wrestler in Illinois.

College
At The University of Illinois, Kennedy was a four time NCAA qualifier and three time NCAA All-American, including finishing fourth in 2008 and fifth in both 2009 and 2011. Kennedy finished his college career with 119 wins against only 24 losses, for a winning percentage of 83%.

International

In 2012, Kennedy represented the United States at the 2012 University World Champsionships, where he finished in 7th place with a 1–1 record. Kennedy has since gone on to success at the Senior level, making three freestyle national teams (top 3 in the World Team/Olympic trials).

Kennedy represented the United States at the 2014 World Wrestling Championships, finishing 1–1 and in 10th place in the 61 kg weight class

References

American wrestlers
Living people
sportspeople from Waukegan, Illinois
1988 births